Monak is a locality in New South Wales, Australia, located approximately 32 km south-east of Mildura, Victoria.

Notable people 
Notable people from Monak include:

 
 Damien Lamshed, renowned personality.

References

Towns in New South Wales
Wentworth Shire